The Dominican Republic competed at the 1968 Summer Olympics in Mexico City, Mexico. 18 competitors, all men, took part in 16 events in 5 sports.

Athletics

Men's 100 metres
 Alberto Torres
 Round 1 — 10.7 s (→ 6th in heat, did not advance)
 Porfirio Veras
 Round 1 — 10.5 s (→ 5th in heat, did not advance)

Men's 200 metres
 Porfirio Veras
 Round 1 — 21.5 s (→ 6th in heat, did not advance)
 Alberto Torres
 Round 1 — 21.9 s (→ 5th in heat, did not advance)

Men's 400 metres
 José L'Oficial
 Round 1 — 47.9 s (→ 7th in heat, did not advance)

Men's 800 metres
 José L'Oficial
 Round 1 — 1:55.6 min (→ 7th in heat, did not advance)

Men's 1500 metres
 Miguel Núñez
 Round 1 — 4:23.6 min (→ 10th in heat, did not advance)

Men's 110 metres hurdles
 Radhames Mora
 Round 1 — 16.8 s (→ 7th in heat, did not advance)

Men's 4x100 metres relay
 Luis Soriano, Alberto Torres, Rafael Domínguez, Porfirio Veras
 Round 1 — 41.4 s (→ 7th in heat, did not advance)

Men's 4x400 metres relay
 Rolando Gómez, Jose L'Oficial, Radhames Mora, David Soriano
 Round 1 — 3:19.4 min (→ 5th in heat, did not advance)

Boxing

Flyweight (48 kg)
 Ignacio Espinal
 Round 1 — Lost to Robert Urretavizcaya of Argentina

Lightweight (60 kg)
 Martín Puello
 Round 2 — Lost to Armando Mendoza of Venezuela

Light welterweight (63.5 kg)
 Donato Cartagena
 Round 2 — Lost to James Wallington of the USA

Shooting

Three shooters, all men, represented the Dominican Republic in 1968.

Trap
 Domingo Lorenzo — 124 pts (→ 55th place)

Skeet
 Riad Yunes — 170 pts (→ 48th place)
 Luis Santana — 57 pts (→ 52nd place)

Weightlifting

Lightweight
 Ramón Silfa
 Press — 95.0 kg
 Snatch — 82.5 kg
 Jerk — DQ (→ no ranking)

Light heavyweight
 José Pérez
 Press — 110.0 kg
 Snatch — 105.0 kg
 Jerk — 135.0 kg
 Total — 350.0 kg (→ 22nd place)

Wrestling

Men's freestyle flyweight (52 kg)
 José Defran
 Round 1 — fought Mohammad Ghorbani of Iran
 Round 2 — fought Richard Sanders of the USA

Men's freestyle featherweight (63 kg)
 Onésimo Rufino
 Round 1 — fought Choi Jung-Heuk of South Korea
 Round 2 — fought Masaaki Kaneko of Japan

References

External links
Official Olympic Reports
Part Three: Results

Nations at the 1968 Summer Olympics
1968
1968 in Dominican Republic sport